Where's The Right Girl (Spanish: Busco novia) is a 2022 Peruvian comedy film directed by Daniel Vega and written by Renato Cisneros. Based on the successful blog of the same name from El Comercio written by Renato Cisneros. It stars César Ritter, Magdyel Ugaz, Vadhir Derbez, Fiorella Pennano, Gustavo Bueno and Grapa Paola.

Synopsis 
Tells the story of Renzo Collazos, a thirty-something journalist who is looking for a girlfriend and who, out of obligation, must start writing a blog about his failed love life.

Cast 
The actors participating in this film are:

 César Ritter as Renzo Collazos
 Magdyel Ugaz as Lucía
 Fiorella Pennano as Mariana
 Vadhir Derbez as Robot
 Gustavo Bueno as Ventoso
 Grapa Paola as Dora

Production 
The film begins filming in mid-February 2019 with a duration of 5 weeks.

Release 
The film was to be released on May 7, 2020 in Peruvian theaters, but the premiere was canceled due to the closure of theaters due to the covid-19 pandemic. Finally, the film was released internationally on November 18, 2022 on Amazon Prime Video.

References

External links 

 

2022 films
2022 comedy films
Peruvian comedy films
Tondero Producciones films
2020s sex comedy films
2020s Peruvian films
2020s Spanish-language films
Films set in Peru
Films shot in Peru
Films about journalists
Films about writers
Films impacted by the COVID-19 pandemic
Films not released in theaters due to the COVID-19 pandemic